Michael Shea (born 4 June 1961) is an Austrian ice hockey player. He competed in the men's tournaments at the 1988 Winter Olympics and the 1994 Winter Olympics.

References

1961 births
Living people
Austrian ice hockey players
Olympic ice hockey players of Austria
Ice hockey players at the 1988 Winter Olympics
Ice hockey players at the 1994 Winter Olympics
Ice hockey people from Montreal
Laval Voisins players
Binghamton Whalers players